The 2008 Northern Illinois Huskies football team represented Northern Illinois University as a member of the West Division of the Mid-American Conference (MAC) during the 2008 NCAA Division I FBS football season. Led by first-year head coach Jerry Kill, the Huskies compiled an overall record of 6–7 with a mark of 5–3 in conference play, placing fourth in the MAC's West Division. Northern Illinois was invited to the Independence Bowl, where they lost to Louisiana Tech. The team played home games at Huskie Stadium in DeKalb, Illinois.

Schedule

Coaching staff
 Jerry Kill, head coach
 Tracy Claeys, defensive coordinator
 Matt Limegrover, offensive coordinator
 Pat Poore, quarterbacks coach
 Rob Reeves, running backs coach
 Brian Anderson, tight ends coach
 Harold Etheridge, offensive line coach
 P. J. Fleck, wide receivers coach, recruiting coordinator
 Tom Matukewicz, linebackers coach
 Jay Sawvel, defensive backs, special teams coach
 Jeff Phelps, defensive line coach
 Brad Brachear, graduate assistant (defense)
 Nate Griffin, graduate Assistant (video)
 Nick Deuel, video coordinator
 Brad Kopp, assistant video coordinator
 Brandon Staley, graduate assistant (recruiting, operations)
 Marc Webel, graduate Assistant (offense)
 Adam Clark, director of football operations
 Eric Klein, sports performance

References

External links
 2008 NIU Football Media Guide

Northern Illinois
Northern Illinois Huskies football seasons
Northern Illinois Huskies football